Jan Obenberger ( May 15, 1892 in Prague – April 30, 1964) was a Czechoslovak entomologist.

He was  Professor of Zoology at the Charles University in Prague. He was a specialist in Buprestidae. Jan Obenberger was very skilled at colour illustration.

Works
Obenberger, J. 1928. De generis Aphanisticus Latr. (Col. Bupr.) speciebus aethiopicis. Africké druhy rodu Aphanisticus Latr. Acta Entomologica Musaei Nationalis Pragae 6:77-98.
Obenberger, J. 1935. De regionis aethiopicae speciebus generis Agrili novis (Col. Bupr.). Nové druhy krasců z rodu Agrilus z aethiopské oblasti. Acta Entomologica Musaei Nationalis Pragae 13:149-210.
Obenberger, J. 1937. Révision des espèces exotiques du genre Trachs Fabr. du continent africain. Přehled exotických druhů rodu Trachys africké pevniny. Acta Entomologica Musei Nationalis Pragae 15:46-101.
Obenberger, J. 1945. Nový druh rodu Promeliboeus Obenb. (Col. Bupr.). De generis Promeliboeus Obenb. species nova (Col. Bupr.). Acta Entomologica Musaei Nationalis Pragae 23:159-160.

Contributions to Coleopterorum Catalogus. W. Junk, Berlin

Obenberger, J. 1926. Pars 84. Buprestidae I. IN: S. Schenkling (ed.), Coleopterorum Catalogus. W. Junk, Berlin, pp. 1–212.
Obenberger, J. 1930. Pars 111. Buprestidae II. IN: S. Schenkling (ed.), Coleopterorum Catalogus. W. Junk, Berlin, pp. 213–568.
Obenberger, J. 1934. Pars 132. Buprestidae III. IN: S. Schenkling (ed.), Coleopterorum Catalogus. W. Junk, Berlin, pp. 569–781.
Obenberger, J. 1935. Pars 143. Buprestidae IV. IN: S. Schenkling (ed.), Coleopterorum Catalogus. W. Junk, Berlin, pp. 782–934.
Obenberger, J. 1936. Pars 152. Buprestidae V. IN: S. Schenkling (ed.), Coleopterorum Catalogus. W. Junk, Berlin, pp. 935–1246.
Obenberger, J. 1937. Pars 157. Buprestidae VI. IN: S. Schenkling (ed.), Coleopterorum Catalogus. W. Junk, Berlin, pp. 1247–1714.

References
Jelinek, J., 1977  Bibliography of scientific papers of prof. Dr. Jan Obenberger. Acta Entomologica Musei Nationalis Pragae 39: 5-27.

External links
Portraits
Insecta Mundi Lectotype designations in the Buprestidae collections of the National Museum of Natural History (Coleoptera)

Czechoslovak entomologists
Academic staff of Charles University
Scientists from Prague
1892 births
1964 deaths